Robert N. Butler (August 1784 – July 31, 1853) was an American politician and physician. He served as Adjutant General of Virginia in the War of 1812, and was State Treasurer of Virginia 1846–53.

Butler was born in Surry County, Virginia, where his family had lived since the mid-17th century. Several of his ancestors had been members of the House of Burgesses.

Butler studied at the College of William and Mary. He eventually obtained a M.D. degree and practiced medicine in Smithfield, Virginia.

Butler married twice. His first wife was Eliza Bracken, whose father, Reverend John Bracken, was rector of Bruton Parish Church, president of the College of William and Mary, and had served as a mayor of Williamsburg. Their son, John Bracken Butler, also became a physician.

His second wife was Otelia Voinard of Petersburg, Virginia. Their daughter, Otelia Voinard Butler, married William Mahone, a railroad executive, Confederate general, United States Senator, and leading figure in the Readjuster Party.

Butler died July 31, 1853. He and his second wife are buried in the cemetery at St. Luke's Church at Benn's Church, Isle of Wight County, Virginia, near Smithfield.

References

People from Smithfield, Virginia
1784 births
1853 deaths
State treasurers of Virginia
American militia generals
Physicians from Virginia
College of William & Mary alumni
19th-century American politicians
People from Surry County, Virginia